The 2011–12 Italian football match-fixing scandal emerged on 1 June 2011 after a number of football-related figures were arrested or placed under official scrutiny by Italian police for alleged match-fixing. The list included well-known figures like former Italian international footballer Giuseppe Signori, as well as former Serie A players Mauro Bressan, Stefano Bettarini and Cristiano Doni. The group was accused of having fixed a wide range of Serie B, Lega Pro Prima Divisione and Lega Pro Seconda Divisione games.

The inquiry started following a denunciation from Lega Pro Prima Divisione club Cremonese, instigated by internal suspicions involving first team goalkeeper Marco Paoloni, who was sold to Benevento in January 2011.

First investigation, June 2011

Involved figures
Marco Paoloni: Benevento goalkeeper, under arrest; deemed to be a central figure in the organization, accused of having actively worked to fix games in the Lega Pro Prima Divisione league in games involving Cremonese (where he played until January 2011) and Benevento (a team he joined during the winter transfer window), including having deliberately doped his former Cremonese teammates in order to fix a game. Also accused of having collected illegal bets and organized match fixes for the whole organization.
Giuseppe Signori: former Italian international footballer and Serie A topscorer, under house arrest; suspected of having placed illegal bets.
Stefano Bettarini: former Italian international footballer, under investigation; suspected of being a member of the criminal match fixing organization.
Antonio Bellavista: former Bari captain, under investigation; suspected of being a member of the criminal match fixing organization.
Mauro Bressan: former Serie A player, under investigation; suspected of being a member of the criminal match fixing organization.
Cristiano Doni: Atalanta captain and former Italian international footballer, under investigation; suspected of being a member of the criminal match fixing organization.
Vittorio Micolucci: Ascoli player, under arrest; suspected of having actively worked in order to fix Serie B games for the criminal match fixing organization.
Vincenzo Sommese: Ascoli player, under arrest; suspected of having actively worked in order to fix Serie B games for the criminal match fixing organization.
Gianfranco Parlato: Viareggio coaching staff member and former Serie B player, under arrest; suspected of having actively worked in order to fix Lega Pro Prima Divisione games for the criminal match fixing organization.

Some of the involved persons had already been questioned or condemned for similar charges: Cristiano Doni was acquitted in 2000, whereas Vincenzo Sommese (in 2007) and Stefano Bettarini (in 2005) were each disqualified for six months due to illegal betting.

Potential consequences
Following the inquiry, media speculated about the possibility that Atalanta and Siena might lose their right to play in Serie A in 2011–12. Atalanta's situation was considered particularly delicate due to the direct involvement of Cristiano Doni in the match fixing process, whereas Siena was accused of having paid Sassuolo players in order to obtain a win by more than three goals (game ended 4–0); Sassuolo, Ascoli, Padova and Piacenza were also mentioned in the inquiry and were at risk of being punished by the Federation due to the "objective responsibility" law.

First-degree sentences
On 9 August 2011, the Italian Football Federation announced the first-degree charges for all involved parties in the scandal.

Clubs
Atalanta B.C.: 6-point deduction in the 2011–12 season.
Ascoli Calcio 1898: 6-point deduction in the 2011–12 season, plus €50,000 fine.
Hellas Verona F.C.: €20,000 fine.
U.S. Sassuolo Calcio: €20,000 fine.
U.S. Alessandria Calcio 1912: last-placed by office in the 2010–11 season, with automatic relegation to the Lega Pro Seconda Divisione as a consequence.
Benevento Calcio: 9-point deduction in the 2011–12 season.
U.S. Cremonese: 6-point deduction in the 2011–12 season, plus €30,000 fine.
F.C. Esperia Viareggio: 1-point deduction in the 2011–12 season.
Piacenza Calcio: 4-point deduction in the 2011–12 season, plus €50,000 fine.
Calcio Portogruaro Summaga: €20,000 fine.
Ravenna Calcio: exclusion from the 2011–12 Lega Pro Prima Divisione with automatic relegation to Lega Pro Seconda Divisione, plus €50,000 fine.
A.C. Reggiana 1919: 2-point deduction in the 2011–12 season.
Spezia Calcio: 1-point deduction in the 2011–12 season.
A.S. Taranto Calcio: 1-point deduction in the 2011–12 season.
Virtus Entella: €15,000 fine.

People
Antonio Bellavista: 5-year ban from football activities.
Mauro Bressan: 3-year, 6-month ban from football activities.
Giorgio Buffone: 5-year ban from football activities.
Antonio Ciriello: 1-year ban from football activities.
Daniele Deoma: 1-year, 9-month ban from football activities.
Cristiano Doni: 3-year, 6-month ban from football activities.
Massimo Erodiani: 5-year ban from football activities.
Gianni Fabbri: 5-year ban from football activities.
Steven Fenicio: given a warning.
Carlo Gervasoni: 5-year ban from football activities.
Thomas Manfredini: 3-year ban from football activities.
Marco Paoloni: 5-year ban from football activities.
Salvatore Quadrini: 1-year ban from football activities.
Leonardo Rossi: 3-year ban from football activities.
Nicola Santoni: 4-year ban from football activities.
Davide Saverino: 3-year ban from football activities.
Giuseppe Signori: 5-year ban from football activities. On 23 February 2021, Signori was acquitted due to a "lack of evidence".
Vincenzo Sommese: 5-year ban from football activities.
Giorgio Veltroni: 4-year ban from football activities.

Appeal
The Corte di Giustizia Federale of Italian Football Federation announced the following appeal.

Thomas Manfredini: acquitted

Court of Final Appeal
The Tribunale Nazionale di Arbitrato per lo Sport of the Italian National Olympic Committee announced the following final appeal:

Cristiano Doni (rejected)

Juve Stabia – Sorrento match-fixing
On 11 October 2011, as part of a betting investigation, FIGC announced the ban for match-fixing of Juve Stabia – Sorrento on 5 April 2009. The case was referred to FIGC by Naples criminal court.

Sentences

Club

People

Second investigation, December 2011
On 19 December 2011, a new police operation coordinated by the Magistrature of Cremona led to a number of high-profile arrests, including active and former footballers such as Cristiano Doni, Luigi Sartor, Alessandro Zamperini, Nicola Santoni, Carlo Gervasoni and Filippo Carobbio. The inquiry started after Gubbio defender Simone Farina denounced a match fixing attempt from Zamperini (a former teammate of him at Roma), with a subsequent investigation leading the police to unveil a complex gambling system involving criminal figures in Singapore, Eastern Europe and Italy with interest in fixing football games all over Europe. Both investigations were initiated and helped by abnormal betting flow reports. Those reports were generated and reported to authorities by Austrian bookmaker SKS365.

The scandal then dramatically evolved a few months later: on 28 May 2012, a number of higher-profile players were involved, and the Cremone Magistrature went on to arrest Lazio vice-captain Stefano Mauri, former Genoa captain Omar Milanetto, Cristian Bertani, Paolo Acerbis, Matteo Gritti, Alessandro Pellicori, Ivan Tisci and Marco Turati, whereas José Joelson Inácio was put under house arrest and Kewullay Conteh and Francesco Ruopolo were forbidden to leave the country. More football figures were also put under investigation: among these, Juventus Serie A-winning head coach Antonio Conte (due to alleged failure to report attempted sporting fraud during his period as Siena manager), former Milan star Kakha Kaladze, Genoa striker Giuseppe Sculli (for whom the judge rejected an arrest request), Chievo striker Sergio Pellissier and Italian international Domenico Criscito who was training at Coverciano with the Azzurri team at the time, and was excluded from the UEFA Euro 2012 roster as a consequence.

Shortly after the latest arrests, Premier Mario Monti publicly suggested that football competition in the country be suspended for at least two years. He indicated that this was his personal opinion, not a formal government proposal. The manager of the Italian national team, Cesare Prandelli, said he "would have no problem" if his side were barred from Euro 2012 in the wake of the scandal.

Sentences
The National Discipline Commission (CDN) of the Italian Football Federation (FIGC) announced the first-degree charges for some involved parties in the scandal on 31 May and 18 June. On 6 July 2012 "Corte di Giustizia Federale" of FIGC announced the appeal ruling.

Clubs
 U.C. AlbinoLeffe: 15-point deduction in the 2012–13 season, plus €90,000 fine.
 A.C. Ancona: 8-point deduction in the 2012–13 season
 Atalanta B.C.: 2-point deduction in the 2012–13 season, plus €25,000 fine.
 Ascoli Calcio 1898: 1-point deduction in the 2012–13 season, plus €20,000 fine.
 U.S. Avesa (5-a-side football): 1-point deduction in the 2012–13 season, plus €200 fine.
 U.S. Cremonese: 1-point deduction in the 2012–13 season, plus €30,000 fine.
 Empoli F.C.: 1-point deduction in the 2012–13 season
 Frosinone Calcio: 1-point deduction in the 2012–13 season
 U.S. Grosseto F.C.: 6-point deduction in the 2012–13 season, plus €60,000 fine.
 A.S. Livorno Calcio: €15,000 fine.
 Modena F.C.: 2-point deduction in the 2012–13 season
 A.C. Monza Brianza 1912: 5-point deduction in the 2012–13 season
 Novara Calcio: 4-point deduction in the 2012–13 season, plus €35,000 fine.
 Calcio Padova: 2-point deduction in the 2012–13 season
 Delfino Pescara 1936: 2-point deduction in the 2012–13 season
 Piacenza F.C.: 11-point deduction in the 2012–13 season, plus €70,000 fine.
 Ravenna Calcio: 1-point deduction in the 2012–13 season
 Reggina Calcio: 4-point deduction in the 2012–13 season
 U.C. Sampdoria: €50,000 fine.
 A.C. Siena: €50,000 fine.
 Spezia Calcio: €30,000 fine.

Appeal

 U.C. AlbinoLeffe: 9-point deduction in the 2012–13 season, plus €45,000 fine.
 Empoli F.C.: 1-point deduction in the 2012–13 season.
 A.C. Monza Brianza 1912: 4-point deduction in the 2012–13 season.
 Novara Calcio: 3-point deduction in the 2012–13 season, plus €35,000 fine.
 Calcio Padova: 2-point deduction in the 2012–13 season.
 Delfino Pescara 1936: €30,000 fine.
 Reggina Calcio: 3-point deduction in the 2012–13 season.
 U.C. Sampdoria: €50,000 fine.
 A.C. Siena: €50,000 fine.
 Spezia Calcio: €30,000 fine.

People

Sentences - September 

On 18 June 2012, FIGC announced that the discipline action against the following players were suspended due to criminal body had started the legal process, the committee resumed the action in September.

Third investigation, March 2012
Following intensive interrogation in March 2012, the authority of Bari and Cremona had referred several players, coaches and clubs to Italian Football Federation for disciplinary action as the third lot of operation. This included Siena coach Antonio Conte, as well as Italian internationals Leonardo Bonucci of Bari, Simone Pepe of Udinese, and Marco Di Vaio of Bologna.

On 1 August, Conte's plea bargain was rejected. On 10 August 2012 Pepe, Bonucci, Di Vaio and three other players were acquitted along with Udinese. A series of appeals from both sides was rejected by the judge; however, Grosseto and club president Piero Camilli were acquitted.

Sentences

Clubs – Cremona line

Clubs – Bari line

People – Cremona line

People – Bari line

See also
 Calcio scommesse and Totonero, for lists of other Italian match-fixing scandals

References

Scan
Scan
Match fixing
History of football in Italy
Sports betting scandals
Association football controversies
Sports scandals in Italy